Ubenide is a constituency of Nauru made up of four districts: Baitsi, Denigomodu, Nibok, and Uaboe. It covers an area of 4.5 km² (1.73 mi²), making it the second largest constituency by area, and is the most populous constituency with a population of 3,300. It returns four members to the Parliament of Nauru in Yaren, being the only district to return four.

Geography
"Ubenide" is an acronym, named after the 4 districts that comprise the constituency - Uaboe, Beidi (the old name of Baitsi), Nibok, and Denigomodu. Ubenide is located along the northeast coast of Nauru, and shares borders with the constituencies of Anetan, Anabar, Buada and Aiwo. The phosphate railway crosses through the constituency in the hills.

Members of Parliament

Election results

Notable people
Derog Gioura, who represented Ubenide in the Parliament of Nauru and served as President of Nauru in 2003.
Russell Kun, who has served as the Republic of Nauru's Justice Minister and as the Speaker of the Parliament of Nauru, and formerly represented Ubenide in Parliament.
David Adeang, formerly Foreign Minister, who was appointed Speaker of the Parliament of Nauru in 2008 and represents Ubenide.

References

External links

Constituencies of Nauru